Jaggar Dam is an Earthen dam near Jagar Village of  Hindaun City in Hindaun Block, Rajasthan, India. The dam was completed in 1957 for the purpose of irrigation and water supply.

Tourism
Jagar Dam is located in Jagar of Hindaun City, Rajasthan. During the weekend, visitors come in groups to picnic in the surroundings and cold air. This is a public place in Aravali hills. Located in the Aravali range is a popular place like a hill station. It is home to its elevation, rivers, lakes and forests. This place is natural related. The local people of village Kotwas have an important contribution in making this natural place safe for animals.

References

Dams in Rajasthan
Earth-filled dams
Dams completed in 1957
Hindaun
1957 establishments in Rajasthan
20th-century architecture in India